Miłków may refer to the following places in Poland:
Miłków, Lower Silesian Voivodeship (south-west Poland)
Miłków, Świętokrzyskie Voivodeship (south-central Poland)
Miłków, Lublin Voivodeship (east Poland)

See also
Milko (disambiguation)